David Garfield Davies, Baron  Davies of Coity,  (24 June 1935 – 4 March 2019 ) was a Labour Co-operative peer in the House of Lords and a former trade union leader.

Biography
Davies left school at 15 and worked as an electrician, serving in the Royal Air Force 1956–58. In 1969 he became a full-time trade union official with USDAW and rose through the ranks, becoming General Secretary of the union in 1986. He retired in 1997.

Davies was named CBE in 1996 and created a life peer as Baron Davies of Coity, of Penybont in the County of Mid Glamorgan on 1 October 1997. Davies belonged to the Labour Friends of Israel lobby group.

Baron Davies of Coity died on 4 March 2019, aged 83.

References

Davies, Garfield, Baron Davies of Coity
Davies, Garfield, Baron Davies of Coity
Davies of Coity, Garfield Davies, Baron
Life peers created by Elizabeth II
Davies, Garfield, Baron Davies of Coity
General Secretaries of the Union of Shop, Distributive and Allied Workers
Members of the General Council of the Trades Union Congress
Labour Friends of Israel